The Benin national under-16 basketball team is a national basketball team of Benin, governed by the Fédération Béninoise de Basketball.
It represents the country in international under-16 (under age 16) basketball competitions.

The team appeared at the 2009 FIBA Africa Under-16 Championship qualification stage.

See also
Benin men's national basketball team
Benin men's national under-18 basketball team
Benin women's national under-18 basketball team

References

External links
Archived records of Benin team participations

Basketball teams in Benin
Men's national under-16 basketball teams
Basketball